Sikkim is a state of India, encompassing a former kingdom.

Sikkim may also refer to:
Kingdom of Sikkim, the independent kingdom, which became part of India in 1975
Sikkim (film), a documentary film about the Kingdom of Sikkim, by Satyajit Ray
Sikkim (Lok Sabha constituency), an electoral constituency coextensive with the state
Sikkim football team, the association football team of the kingdom and the state

See also 
 Sikhism